Omaha is a 2008 studio album by Ulf Lundell. The album saw Lundell working with Kjell Andersson for the first time in 19 years, an experience that Lundell deemed unpleasant and the "worst album-recording of his career". However, the album proved successful in Sweden, peaking at number one on the Swedish Albums Chart. It also peaked at number 40 on the Norwegian Albums Chart.

Track listing
Omaha - 5.28
Butiken - 5.11
Hitza hitz - 4.11
Lär dej älska mörkret - 5.41
Lilla kärleken - 3.32
Underbar morgon - 5.28
Rik man - 4.06
Pissväderspolska - 3.02
Spike - 2.38
Under natten regn - 3.50
Din tid är ute - 4.54
På ett vallmofält - 3.22
Innan 20 på 19 - 8.33
Tillbaka till världen - 5.01
Koltrastsången - 5.06

Contributors
Ulf Lundell - song, acoustic guitar, munspel, bass mandolin & choir 
Jens Frithiof – electric guitar, acoustic guitar, rickenbacker 12:a, slide, e bow, mandolin, banjo, bouzouki, pedal steel 
Marcus Olsson - hammond, piano, synth, tramporgel, mellotron, celeste, clarinet, bass clarinet, soprano saxophone, tenorsax, baritone saxophone, flute
Jerker Odelholm - electric bass, double bass
Andreas Dahlbäck - drums, percussion, timpani, marimba, vibraphone
David Nyström - choir
Mauro Scocco - choir
Josef Zackrisson - choir 
Samuel Andersson - violin, Mora harp, octave violin, slagburdun 
Anna Dager - cello 
Carl Zim Lundell - electric guitar 
Charlotte Berg - song 
Stockholm Session Strings members - strings

Charts

Weekly charts

Year-end charts

References

2008 albums
Ulf Lundell albums
Swedish-language albums